Stolovnik is a dispersed settlement east of Brestanica in the Municipality of Krško in eastern Slovenia. The area is part of the traditional region of Styria. It is now included with the rest of the municipality in the Lower Sava Statistical Region.

References

External links
Stolovnik on Geopedia

Populated places in the Municipality of Krško